Pancho & Lefty is a honky tonk album by outlaw country musicians Merle Haggard and Willie Nelson, released in 1983.  Original vinyl copies from 1983 give the album's title as "Poncho & Lefty" on the cover, as well as on the inner sleeve and the record label; the album's title track is similarly rendered "Poncho & Lefty" on the cover, inner sleeve, and label.  Later editions correct the title to the intended "Pancho & Lefty". They are backed by Don Markham of The Strangers.

Background
The title track was written by Texas songwriter Townes Van Zandt and was recorded towards the end of the recording sessions. The song tells the story of a Mexican bandit named Pancho and a more mysterious character, Lefty, and implies that Pancho was killed after he was betrayed by his associate Lefty, who was paid off by the Mexican federales. In the Van Zandt documentary Be Here To Love Me, Nelson recalls how the album with Haggard was nearly completed but he felt they didn't have "that blockbuster, you know, that one big song for a good single and a video, and my daughter Lana suggested that we listen to 'Pancho and Lefty'.  I had never heard it and Merle had never heard it." Lana Nelson returned with a copy of the song and Nelson cut it immediately with his band in the middle of the night but had to retrieve a sleeping Haggard, who had retired to his bus hours earlier, to record his vocal part. Van Zandt appears in the video for the song playing one of the Mexican federales.  "It was real nice they invited me," Van Zandt told Aretha Sills in 1994. The song topped the Billboard country music singles chart. A second single, the sombre "Reasons to Quit," was another Top 10 hit.

Haggard and Nelson would record another album together, Seashores of Old Mexico, in 1987.

Reception

Martin Monkman of AllMusic calls the album "an album by two legends that lives up to, and at one point exceeds, expectations... one gets the sense that this is a collaboration in every sense." Music critic Robert Christgau wrote "Haggard hasn't sung with so much care in years, which is obviously Nelson's doing..."

Track listing

Personnel
Merle Haggard– vocals, guitar
Willie Nelson – vocals, guitar
Lewis Talley – guitar
Grady Martin – guitar
Don Markham  – saxophone, trumpet
Johnny Gimble –  fiddle, mandolin
Mickey Raphael – harmonica
Reggie Young – guitar
Chips Moman – guitar
Johnny Christopher – guitar
Bobby Emmons – keyboards
Bobby Wood – keyboards
Mike Leech – bass
Gene Chrisman – drums

Chart performance

Album

Singles

References 

1983 albums
Merle Haggard albums
Willie Nelson albums
Vocal duet albums
Albums produced by Chips Moman
Epic Records albums